Route 12 is a , two-lane, uncontrolled-access, secondary highway in western Prince Edward Island, Canada. Its southern terminus is at Route 11 in Miscouche and its northern terminus is at the North Cape Hiking Trail in Tignish. The route parallels Route 2 as it travels toward the North Cape.

Route description 

The route begins at its southern terminus, goes north, and turns left near Rosehill. It crosses the Grand River and turns right in the community of the same name. It continues north and turns left in Low Point. Two left turns in Foxley River lead to a  concurrency with Route 2 between Portage and West Devon. Two bridges over the Trout and Mill rivers lead to a right turn into Alberton. Travelling further north up the north coast of the island, the route crosses the Kildare River and goes by Tignish before ending at the North Cape Hiking Trail.

Junction list

References 

012
012